Đỗ Thanh Thịnh (born 18 August 1998) is a Vietnamese professional footballer who plays as a defender for V.League 1 club Topeland Bình Định.

Honours
Vietnam U23
Southeast Asian Games: 2019

References

External links
 

1998 births
Living people
Vietnamese footballers
Association football defenders
V.League 1 players
SHB Da Nang FC players
Competitors at the 2019 Southeast Asian Games
Southeast Asian Games medalists in football
Southeast Asian Games gold medalists for Vietnam